Kevin Leonard Orie (born September 1, 1972) is an American former professional baseball third baseman. He is an alumnus of Indiana University, where he was a standout for the Hoosiers baseball team.

Career

Chicago Cubs
The Chicago Cubs selected Orie with the 29th pick in the first round of the 1993 Major League Baseball draft. Orie made his Major League Baseball debut on April 1, as a member of the Chicago Cubs. It was in his rookie year of 1997 that Orie would put up his best career statistics. In 114 games played, Orie compiled a .275 batting average with 8 home runs and 44 RBI. Orie was a finalist in the 1997 MLB Rookie of the Year Award balloting, losing out to the eventual winner, Scott Rolen.

Orie had a role in Kerry Wood's near perfect game on May 6, 1998, where he threw a one-hit, no walk, 20-strikeout shutout against the Houston Astros, tying Roger Clemens' record for strikeouts in a nine-inning game and breaking Bill Gullickson's single-game rookie record of 18 strikeouts in 1980. Wood allowed only two baserunners: an infield single by Ricky Gutierrez, and he hit Craig Biggio. The single went off third baseman Orie's glove.

Florida Marlins
Through the first 64 games of the  season, Orie got off to a dismal start, compiling only a .181 batting average in over 200 at-bats. Subsequently, on the last day before the July 31 trading deadline, the Cubs sent Orie and minor leaguer Todd Noel to the Florida Marlins for Félix Heredia and minor leaguer Steve Hoff.

After concluding the 1998 season with the Marlins, Orie would remain with Florida for the entire  season, tallying a .254 batting average with 6 home runs and 29 RBI while appearing in 77 games.

Free agency
After the 1999 season, the Marlins needed to make room for their future third baseman, Mike Lowell, making Orie expendable. On November 12, 1999, the Marlins sent Orie to the Los Angeles Dodgers as part of a conditional deal. Although Orie put together an impressive spring training with the Dodgers prior to the  season, the club already had two established third basemen on their roster: Adrián Beltré & Dave Hansen. Thus, the Dodgers released Orie on March 29, 2000, days before the season would begin.

Two months later, on June 15, 2000, Orie signed a free agent contract with the Kansas City Royals, only to be released two months later. The next suitor for Orie turned out to be the New York Yankees, who signed Orie two days after his Royals release. He would remain in the Yankees minor league system the entire 2000 season, without making a single appearance at the major league level.

After the 2000 season, Orie would once again be released. He would sign another free agent contract prior to the  season with the Philadelphia Phillies, and once again spend the length of the season in the minor leagues. He would then be released.

On November 19, 2001, Orie would be signed by one of his old teams, the Chicago Cubs. On March 12, Orie's second stint with the Cubs would end.

Over the next three years, Orie would be signed by three more teams: the Cleveland Indians, Houston Astros, and Milwaukee Brewers. He would not appear in the majors with any of the teams.

2006
Spring training in preparation for the 2006 season would find Orie once again in camp with the Houston Astros. Although Orie had played in only 13 major league games since the 1999 season concluded, he compiled impressive numbers every year in the minor leagues. Many thought that Orie still had the potential to stick in the major leagues and serve as a valuable backup third baseman for a number of teams. Orie didn't make the Astros and was assigned to the Triple-A Round Rock Express. Orie retired after the first game of the season.

Post-retirement
Orie is an associate specializing in retail with real estate management firm Grubb Ellis in Pittsburgh and later served as the pregame and postgame announcer for 93.7 The Fan in Pittsburgh.

Personal life
Orie was married to Melissa Kratsa Orie, whom he had three daughters with. Melissa died on February 24, 2013.

References

External links

 Kevin Orie

1972 births
Living people
Akron Aeros players
American expatriate baseball players in Canada
Baseball players from Pennsylvania
Calgary Cannons players
Chicago Cubs players
Columbus Clippers players
Daytona Cubs players
Florida Marlins players
Indiana Hoosiers baseball players
Iowa Cubs players
Major League Baseball third basemen
Nashville Sounds players
New Orleans Zephyrs players
Omaha Golden Spikes players
Orlando Cubs players
People from West Chester, Pennsylvania
Peoria Chiefs players
Round Rock Express players
Scranton/Wilkes-Barre Red Barons players
Sportspeople from Chester County, Pennsylvania